Maryland Route 462 (MD 462) is a state highway located in Harford County in the U.S. state of Maryland.  Known as Paradise Road, the route runs  from MD 132 in Aberdeen north to MD 155 near Hopewell Village.  MD 462 was built in the early 1930s.

Route description

MD 462 begins at an intersection with MD 132 (Bel Air Avenue) in the city of Aberdeen.  The state highway heads north as a two-lane undivided road through a residential neighborhood.  Shortly after passing west of Aberdeen High School, MD 462 intersects MD 22 (Aberdeen Thruway), which connects Aberdeen Proving Ground with Interstate 95 (I-95) and the town of Bel Air.  The state highway continues north through residential areas and leaves the city limits of Aberdeen between crossings of Carsins Run and Swan Creek.  MD 462 passes through a mix of farmland and forest and passes under I-95 with no access.  The state highway has staggered intersections with Chapel Road, which heads east toward the city of Havre de Grace and west toward Aldino.  MD 462 intersects Webster Road, the old alignment of MD 155, before reaching its northern terminus at MD 155 (Level Road) in the hamlet of Webster east of Hopewell Village.

History
MD 462 was fully paved in macadam from Aberdeen to Webster by 1933.  The state highway has not changed since except for minor improvements.

Junction list

See also

References

External links

MDRoads: MD 462
MD 462 at AARoads.com

462
Maryland Route 462